Oregon's 3rd congressional district covers most of Multnomah County, including Gresham, Troutdale, and most of Portland east of the Willamette River (parts of Northwest and Southwest Portland lie in the 1st and 5th districts).  It also includes the northeastern part of Clackamas County and all of Hood River County. Generally, most of Portland east of the Willamette River is in the 3rd District.

The district has been represented by Democrat Earl Blumenauer since a 1996 special election. It is the second-most Democratic district in the Pacific Northwest, with a Cook Partisan Voting Index of D+22; only  is more Democratic.

List of members representing the district 

Recent presidential elections

Recent election results
Sources (official results only): 
Elections History from the Oregon Secretary of State website
Election Statistics from the website of the Clerk of the United States House of Representatives

1994

1996 special election
A special election was held on May 21, 1996 to fill the vacancy created when incumbent Ron Wyden resigned effective February 5, 1996 after winning a special election to the United States Senate. The winner of the election, Earl Blumenauer, served the remainder of Wyden's two-year term.

1996

1998

2000

2002

2004

2006

2008

2010

2012

2014

2016

2018

2020

2022

Historical district boundaries

Before the 2002 redistricting, the whole of Multnomah County was included in the district; it lost southwest Portland to the 1st and 5th districts, but it gained most of its current portion of Clackamas County.

See also

Oregon's congressional districts
List of United States congressional districts

References
Specific

General

 Congressional Biographical Directory of the United States 1774–present

03
Clackamas County, Oregon
Multnomah County, Oregon
1913 establishments in Oregon
Constituencies established in 1913